The Cheetah Girls: One World is the soundtrack album to the 2008 Disney Channel Original Movie of the same name. It was released on August 19, 2008 by Walt Disney Records. This CD also uses the CDVU+ feature.

The songs on the soundtrack are diverse blend of pop, hip hop and R&B with strong influences of Bollywood and bhangra. The album peaked at number thirteen on the US Billboard 200.

The album was released in the UK on December 8, 2008.

Track listing 

 Tracks 3, 7, 9 and 10 features vocals of other cast members.
 Track 11 was credited as "Getting Crazy on the Dance Floor" in the movie.
 Track 10 is featured only on the DVD/Blu-ray disc on the extended version.

Disney Karaoke series

The Disney Karaoke Series: One World is a karaoke album featuring songs from the Walt Disney Pictures movie The Cheetah Girls: One World. Disney Karaoke Series: One World, was released on September 16, 2008.

Track listing

Chart performance

References

The Cheetah Girls albums
Walt Disney Records soundtracks
2008 soundtrack albums
2008 compilation albums